Taylor Vetter Jenkins (born September 12, 1984) is an American professional basketball coach who is the head coach of the Memphis Grizzlies of the National Basketball Association (NBA).

Early life and education
Jenkins attended the St. Mark's School of Texas in Dallas. He was a two-time captain on their basketball team, where he played as an undersized  forward. He studied at the Wharton School of the University of Pennsylvania and earned a Bachelor's of Science in Economics while concentrating in Management and minoring in Psychology. He did not play college basketball.

Coaching career
Jenkins interned with the San Antonio Spurs basketball operations department during the 2007–08 season.

From 2008 to 2013, Jenkins worked as an assistant coach and a head coach for the San Antonio Spurs D-League affiliate, the Austin Toros. As the head coach, Jenkins led the Toros to a 27–23 (.540) record during the 2012–13 season and a first-round playoff victory over the Bakersfield Jam before falling to the Santa Cruz Warriors in the semifinals. In 2011–2012, Jenkins was an assistant on the coaching staff when the Toros won the D-League Championship.

Jenkins worked as an assistant coach for the Atlanta Hawks for five years (2013–2018) under head coach Mike Budenholzer. The Hawks reached the playoffs four consecutive years including a trip to the Eastern Conference Finals in 2015. Jenkins helped develop four of the Hawks 2015 starting five into NBA All-Stars (four starters appeared on the 2015 NBA All-Star roster). Jenkins later followed Budenholzer to be an assistant for the Milwaukee Bucks during the 2018–19 NBA season. The Bucks finished with a league best 60 wins, and clinched the #1 spot in the Eastern Conference for the first time in 45 years.

His name was brought into the spotlight when an ESPN clip showed Jenkins springing up from the bench to hold the players back during a small on-court scuffle. The video led to a profile of him in The Athletic.

Jenkins also served as an assistant coach for the NBA Eastern Conference All-Star Team and NBA World Team (Rising Stars) in 2015. Also, in August 2016, Jenkins participated in the Americas Team Camp presented by Nike in Mexico City. The camp consisted of four days of basketball drills and competition conducted by NBA players and coaches.

Memphis Grizzlies
On June 11, 2019, the Memphis Grizzlies hired Jenkins as their new head coach. The Memphis Commercial Appeal called the hire a "defining moment for owner Robert Pera," as well as the front office.

Jenkins was named the Western Conference's Coach of the Month in both January 2020 and December 2021. In 2022, the Grizzlies won their division for the first time in franchise history.

Head coaching record

|-
| style="text-align:left;"|Memphis
| style="text-align:left;"|
| 73 || 34 || 39 ||  || style="text-align:center;"|3rd in Southwest || — || — || — || —
| style="text-align:center;"|Missed playoffs
|-
| style="text-align:left;"|Memphis
| style="text-align:left;"|
| 72 || 38 || 34 ||  || style="text-align:center;"|2nd in Southwest || 5 || 1 || 4 || 
| style="text-align:center;"|Lost in First Round
|-
| style="text-align:left;"|Memphis
| style="text-align:left;"|
| 82 || 56 || 26 ||  || style="text-align:center;"|1st in Southwest || 12 || 6 || 6 || 
| style="text-align:center;"|Lost in Conference Semifinals
|- class="sortbottom"
| style="text-align:center;" colspan="2"|Career || 227 || 128 || 99 ||  ||   || 17 || 7 || 10 ||  ||

References

1984 births
Living people
American men's basketball coaches
Atlanta Hawks assistant coaches
Memphis Grizzlies head coaches
Milwaukee Bucks assistant coaches
Sportspeople from Arlington, Texas
St. Mark's School (Texas) alumni
University of Pennsylvania alumni
Basketball coaches from Texas